Kvėdarna is a town in Šilalė district municipality, Tauragė County, Lithuania. According to the 2011 census, the town has a population of 1,597 people.

The etymology of the name is unknown, there are klose to none similar words in Lithuanian. The only guess is the name of the river "Kvėdainale" and the hypothetical shift 'i' -> 'r'.

History
Before World War II, the local Jewish population represent 30% of the total population. During the war, Jews were massacred in a mass execution and others deported in labor camps.

References

Towns in Lithuania
Towns in Tauragė County
Rossiyensky Uyezd